The Peugeot 207 S2000 is a Super 2000 rally car developed by Peugeot Sport. It is based upon the Peugeot 207 road car. Drivers Enrique García Ojeda, Nicolas Vouilloz and Kris Meeke won the Intercontinental Rally Challenge (IRC) drivers' title in 2007, 2008 and 2009 respectively in a Peugeot 207 S2000.

IRC Victories
{|class="wikitable" style="font-size: 95%; "
! No.
! Event
! Season
! Driver
! Co-driver
|-
|align="right" style="padding-right: 0.5em;"| 1
|  2007 Rally of Turkey
|align="center"| 2007
|  Nicolas Vouilloz
|  Nicolas Klinger
|-
|align="right" style="padding-right: 0.5em;"| 2
|  2007 Belgium Ypres Westhoek Rally
|align="center"| 2007
|  Luca Rossetti
|  Matteo Chiarcossi
|-
|align="right" style="padding-right: 0.5em;"| 3
|  2007 Barum Rally Zlín
|align="center"| 2007
|  Nicolas Vouilloz
|  Nicolas Klinger
|-
|align="right" style="padding-right: 0.5em;"| 4
|  2007 Rallye San Remo
|align="center"| 2007
|  Luca Rossetti
|  Matteo Chiarcossi
|-
|align="right" style="padding-right: 0.5em;"| 5
|  2007 Rallye International du Valais
|align="center"| 2007
|  Nicolas Vouilloz
|  Nicolas Klinger
|-
|align="right" style="padding-right: 0.5em;"| 6
|  2008 Istanbul Rally
|align="center"| 2008
|  Luca Rossetti
|  Matteo Chiarcossi
|-
|align="right" style="padding-right: 0.5em;"| 7
|  2008 Rallye de Portugal
|align="center"| 2008
|  Luca Rossetti
|  Matteo Chiarcossi
|-
|align="right" style="padding-right: 0.5em;"| 8
|  2008 Belgium Ypres Westhoek Rally
|align="center"| 2008
|  Freddy Loix
|  Robin Buysmans
|-
|align="right" style="padding-right: 0.5em;"| 9
|  2008 Rally Russia
|align="center"| 2008
|  Juho Hänninen
|  Mikko Markkula
|-
|align="right" style="padding-right: 0.5em;"| 10
|  2008 Rali Vinho da Madeira
|align="center"| 2008
|  Nicolas Vouilloz
|  Nicolas Klinger
|-
|align="right" style="padding-right: 0.5em;"| 11
|  2008 Barum Czech Rally Zlín
|align="center"| 2008
|  Freddy Loix
|  Robin Buysmans
|-
|align="right" style="padding-right: 0.5em;"| 12
|  2008 Rallye International du Valais
|align="center"| 2008
|  Freddy Loix
|  Robin Buysmans
|-
|align="right" style="padding-right: 0.5em;"| 13
|  2009 Monte Carlo Rally
|align="center"| 2009
|  Sébastien Ogier
|  Julien Ingrassia
|-
|align="right" style="padding-right: 0.5em;"| 14
|  2009 Rallye Internacional de Curitiba
|align="center"| 2009
|  Kris Meeke
|  Paul Nagle
|-
|align="right" style="padding-right: 0.5em;"| 15
|  2009 Rallye Açores
|align="center"| 2009
|  Kris Meeke
|  Paul Nagle
|-
|align="right" style="padding-right: 0.5em;"| 16
|  2009 Belgium Ypres Westhoek Rally
|align="center"| 2009
|  Kris Meeke
|  Paul Nagle
|-
|align="right" style="padding-right: 0.5em;"| 17
|  2009 Rallye Sanremo
|align="center"| 2009
|  Kris Meeke
|  Paul Nagle
|-
|align="right" style="padding-right: 0.5em;"| 18
|  2010 Rally International of Curitiba
|align="center"| 2010
|  Kris Meeke
|  Paul Nagle
|-
|align="right" style="padding-right: 0.5em;"| 19
|  2010 Rallye Açores
|align="center"| 2010
|  Bruno Magalhães
|  Carlos Magalhães
|-
|align="right" style="padding-right: 0.5em;"| 20
|  2010 Rallye Sanremo
|align="center"| 2010
|  Paolo Andreucci
|  Anna Andreussi
|-
|align="right" style="padding-right: 0.5em;"| 21
|  2011 Monte Carlo Rally
|align="center"| 2011
|  Bryan Bouffier
|  Xavier Panseri
|-
|align="right" style="padding-right: 0.5em;"| 22
|  2011 Tour de Corse
|align="center"| 2011
|  Thierry Neuville
|  Nicolas Gilsoul
|-
|align="right" style="padding-right: 0.5em;"| 23
|  2011 Rallye Sanremo
|align="center"| 2011
|  Thierry Neuville
|  Nicolas Gilsoul
|-
|}

ERC Victories
{|class="wikitable" style="font-size: 95%; "
! No.
! Event
! Season
! Driver
! Co-driver
|-
|align="right" style="padding-right: 0.5em;"| 1
|  2007 Rally of Turkey
|align="center"| 2007
|  Nicolas Vouilloz
|  Nicolas Klinger
|-
|align="right" style="padding-right: 0.5em;"| 2
|  2007 Belgium Ypres Westhoek Rally
|align="center"| 2007
|  Enrique García Ojeda
|  Jordi Barrabés Costa
|-
|align="right" style="padding-right: 0.5em;"| 3
|  2007 Rali Vinho da Madeira
|align="center"| 2007
|  Enrique García Ojeda
|  Jordi Barrabés Costa
|-
|align="right" style="padding-right: 0.5em;"| 4
|  2007 Barum Rally Zlín
|align="center"| 2007
|  Nicolas Vouilloz
|  Nicolas Klinger
|-
|align="right" style="padding-right: 0.5em;"| 5
|  2008 Istanbul Rally
|align="center"| 2008
|  Luca Rossetti
|  Matteo Chiarcossi
|-
|align="right" style="padding-right: 0.5em;"| 6
|  2008 Rally 1000 Miglia
|align="center"| 2008
|  Luca Rossetti
|  Matteo Chiarcossi
|-
|align="right" style="padding-right: 0.5em;"| 7
|  2008 Rajd Polski
|align="center"| 2008
|  Michał Sołowow
|  Maciej Baran
|-
|align="right" style="padding-right: 0.5em;"| 8
|  2008 Belgium Ypres Westhoek Rally
|align="center"| 2008
|  Luca Rossetti
|  Matteo Chiarcossi
|-
|align="right" style="padding-right: 0.5em;"| 9
|  2008 Rally Bulgaria
|align="center"| 2008
|  Krum Donchev
|  Stoiko Valchev
|-
|align="right" style="padding-right: 0.5em;"| 10
|  2008 Rallye Antibes Cote d´Azur
|align="center"| 2008
|  Michał Sołowow
|  Maciej Baran
|-
|align="right" style="padding-right: 0.5em;"| 11
|  2009 Istanbul Rally
|align="center"| 2009
|  Michał Sołowow
|  Maciej Baran
|-
|align="right" style="padding-right: 0.5em;"| 12
|  2009 Croatia Delta Rally
|align="center"| 2009
|  Krum Donchev
|  Petar Yordanov
|-
|align="right" style="padding-right: 0.5em;"| 13
|  2009 Barum Czech Rally Zlín
|align="center"| 2009
|  Michał Sołowow
|  Maciej Baran
|-
|align="right" style="padding-right: 0.5em;"| 14
|  2010 Barum Czech Rally Zlín
|align="center"| 2010
|  Bryan Bouffier
|  Xavier Panseri
|-
|align="right" style="padding-right: 0.5em;"| 15
|  2010 Rally Principe de Asturias
|align="center"| 2010
|  Luigi Fontana
|  Renzo Casazza
|-
|align="right" style="padding-right: 0.5em;"| 16
|  2010 Rallye Antibes Côte d'Azur
|align="center"| 2010
|  Luca Betti
|  Guido d'Amore
|-
|align="right" style="padding-right: 0.5em;"| 17
|  2011 Rally Turkey
|align="center"| 2011
|  Luca Betti
|  Maurizio Barone
|-
|align="right" style="padding-right: 0.5em;"| 18
|  2011 Rally Principe de Asturias
|align="center"| 2011
|  Luca Betti
|  Maurizio Barone
|-
|align="right" style="padding-right: 0.5em;"| 19
|  2012 Rali Vinho da Madeira
|align="center"| 2012
|  Bruno Magalhães
|  Nuno Rodrigues da Silva
|-
|align="right" style="padding-right: 0.5em;"| 20
|  2012 Rallye International du Valais
|align="center"| 2012
|  Laurent Reuche
|  Jean Deriaz
|-
|align="right" style="padding-right: 0.5em;"| 21
|  2013 Tour de Corse 
|align="center"| 2013
|  Bryan Bouffier
|  Xavier Panseri
|-
|align="right" style="padding-right: 0.5em;"| 22
|  2013 Rallye Sanremo 
|align="center"| 2013
|  Giandomenico Basso
|  Mitia Dotta
|-
|}

Super 2000 cars
207 S2000
Cars introduced in 2007
All-wheel-drive vehicles